Cupcakes is a 2013 Israeli Hebrew-language musical comedy film.

Plot 
In Tel Aviv, a group of friends meet to watch the Universong song contest. The friends are unimpressed by the Israeli entry and start singing their own song. A mobile phone recording of the singing goes viral and the group are selected as the Israeli entry for the next Universong.

Cast

Themes 
The song contest in Cupcakes is modelled on the Eurovision Song Contest. Fox said that he wanted to make a "feel good movie" with Cupcakes.

Reception

Critical reception 
Andy Webster in The New York Times praised the film's casting and production design. Sheri Linden for the Los Angeles Times praised the "bright zingers and seamless fantasy sequences" of the film, but said that clunky moments held the film back.

The Guardians Dee Rudebeck awarded the film three out of five stars. Rudebeck was critical of the lack of complex character development, but added that this shouldn't be an issue for fans of the genre. The London Evening Standard also awarded the film three out of five stars.

Variety praised the film as "Endearingly goofy". The Hollywood Reporter bemoaned that the film "lacks the anarchical humor necessary to overcome its predictable elements".

The Jerusalem Post described the film as an "infectious and enjoyable movie".

References

External links 

 
 

Films directed by Eytan Fox
2013 films
2010s Hebrew-language films